Various elections were held in Texas in 2021, including a special election to congress, multiple special elections to the Texas House of Representatives, eight legislatively-referred ballot measures on the November 2 ballot, and many regularly-scheduled local elections.

Federal

Congress

Texas's 6th congressional district special election

The 2021 Texas's 6th congressional district special election was caused by the death of incumbent Republican Ron Wright on February 7. A nonpartisan blanket primary was held on May 5. No candidate won over 50% of the vote, leading to a run-off between Jake Ellzey, a member of the Texas House of Representatives from the 10th district, and Susan Wright, the widow of Ron Wright—both of whom were Republicans. The run-off was held on July 27 and won by Jake Ellzey with 53.27% of the vote.

State

Legislative

House of Representatives 68th district special election
The 2021 Texas's 68th House of Representatives district special election was caused by the resignation of incumbent Republican Drew Springer on January 6 to join the Texas Senate. The special election took place on February 23. A nonpartisan blanket primary was held on January 23. No candidate won over 50% of the vote, leading to a run-off between David Spiller and Craig Carter, both Republicans. The run-off was held on February 23, 2021 and won by Spiller with 62.9% of the vote.

House of Representatives 10th district special election
The 2021 Texas's 10th House of Representatives district special election was caused by the resignation of incumbent Republican Jake Ellzey on July 30 to become a U.S. Representative after winning the 2021 Texas's 6th congressional district special election. A nonpartisan blanket primary was held on August 31. No candidate won over 50% of the vote, leading to a run-off between Brian Harrison, a former Trump administration official, and John Wray, who previously held the 10th seat—both Republicans. The run-off was held on September 28 and won by Harrison with 55.38% of the vote.

House of Representatives 118th district special election
The 2021 Texas's 118th House of Representatives district special election was caused by the resignation of incumbent Democrat Leo Pacheco on August 19 to teach public administration at San Antonio College. A nonpartisan blanket primary was held on September 28. No candidate won over 50% of the vote, leading to a run-off between Republican John Lujan, who previously represented the district, and Democrat Frank Ramirez. The run-off was held on November 2 and the seat was flipped by Lujan with about 51% of the vote.

Ballot measures
Eight ballot measures will appear on the November 2, 2021 general election ballot in Texas.

Proposition 1
Proposition 1, the Authorize Charitable Raffles at Rodeo Venues Amendment, will amend the state constitution if passed to allow raffles to be conducted at rodeo venues.

Proposition 2
Proposition 2, the Authorize Counties to Issue Infrastructure Bonds in Blighted Areas Amendment, will amend the state constitution if passed to allow counties to issue bond to fund transportation projects in blighted areas, within certain restrictions.

Proposition 3
Proposition 3, the Prohibition on Limiting Religious Services or Organizations Amendment, will amend the state constitution if passed to "prohibit the state or any political subdivision from enacting a law, rule, order, or proclamation that limits religious services or organizations".

Proposition 4
Proposition 4, the Changes to Eligibility for Certain Judicial Offices Amendment, will amend the state constitution if passed to change eligibility requirements for various judicial offices in the state of Texas.

Proposition 5
Proposition 5, the State Commission on Judicial Conduct Authority Over Candidates for Judicial Office Amendment, will amend the state constitution if passed to allow the State Commission on Judicial Conduct to investigate and discipline candidates seeking judicial office in the same manner as they can investigate and discipline current officeholders.

Proposition 6
Proposition 6, the Right to Designated Essential Caregiver Amendment, will amend the state constitution if passed to "establish a right for residents of nursing or assisted living facilities to designate an essential caregiver, who cannot be prohibited from in-person visitation".

Proposition 7
Proposition 7, the Homestead Tax Limit for Surviving Spouses of Disabled Individuals Amendment, will amend the state constitution if passed to "allow the surviving spouse of a disabled individual to maintain a homestead property tax limit if the spouse is 55 years of age or older at the time of the death and remains at the homestead".

Proposition 8
Proposition 8, the Homestead Tax Exemption for Surviving Spouses of Military Fatally Injured in the Line of Duty Amendment, will amend the state constitution if passed to "allow the legislature to provide a homestead property tax exemption for the surviving spouse of a military member 'killed or fatally injured in the line of duty'", as opposed to the status quo which only allows an exemption for spouses of those designated killed in action.

See also
2021 United States state legislative elections

References

 
Texas